The Chamaemyiidae are a small family of acalyptrate flies with less than 200 species described worldwide. The larvae of these small flies are active and predatory and are often used for biological control of aphids, scale insects, and similar pests. Chamaemyiid fossils are poorly represented in amber deposits, but a few examples are known from the Eocene epoch onwards.

Description
For terms, see Morphology of Diptera
The Chamaemyiidae are small flies 9 (1–5 mm), usually greyish in colour. The frons is wide, with at most two pairs of bristles (often bare). The face is gently concave or strongly receding. Oral vibrissae are absent and the postvertical bristles are convergent or absent. The proboscis is short and the antennae are short. The mesonotum is with or without bristles. Prothoracic bristles are absent and with one sternopleural bristle. The mesopleura are usually bare, rarely setulose. The front femora bear bristles. The tibiae are without preapical bristles. Wings with the subcosta are entire, sometimes touching the first vein before its end. The anal vein does not reach nearly to the wing margin, the anal and second basal cells are always complete, and the costa is not broken. The abdomen is short or slightly elongated.

Classification
Subfamily Cremifaniinae
Genus Cremifania Czerny, 1904
Subfamily Chamaemyiinae
Tribe Chamaemyiini
Genus Acrometopia Schiner, 1862
Genus Chamaeleucopis Gaimari, 2012
Genus Chamaemyia Meigen, 1803
Genus Hamecamyia Gaimari, 2001
Genus Melametopia Tanasijtshuk, 1992
Genus Melanochthiphila Frey, 1958
Genus Ortalidina Blanchard, 1852
Genus Paraleucopis Malloch, 1913
Genus Parapamecia Cogan, 1978
Genus Parochthiphila Czerny, 1904
Genus Plunomia Curran, 1934
Genus Pseudoleucopis Malloch, 1925
Genus Pseudodinia Coquillett, 1902
Tribe Leucopini
Genus Anchioleucopis Tanasijtshuk, 1997
Genus Echinoleucopis Gaimari & Tanasijtshuk, 2001
Genus Leucopis Meigen, 1830
Subgenus Leucopis Meigen, 1830
Subgenus Leucopomyia Malloch, 1921
Subgenus Neoleucopis Malloch, 1921
Subgenus Xenoleucopis Malloch, 1933
Genus Leucopomyia Malloch, 1921
Genus Lipoleucopis de Meijere, 1928
Genus Neoleucopis Malloch, 1921

References

Further reading
 Tanasiychuk, VN, 1986 Fauna USSR: Diptera. Vol. 14, part 7: Mukhi-serebryanki (Chamaeiidae) Nauka Leningrad. Text Russian 608 text figs, 70 b/w photos. 335pp.

External links

Diptera info Images
Family Chamaemyiidae at EOL
West Palaearctic List
Nearctic list
Japan list
Dipterists' Forum
Fossil Diptera Catalogue
Family description

 
Brachycera families